Maîtres contemporains de l'orgue is an eight-volume collection edited by abbot Joseph Joubert published by Éditions Maurice Senart; the first three volumes appeared in 1912. The first six volumes are "for organ or harmonium", so the pieces in them do not include a mandatory pedal part.

Preface
L'Anthologie des Maîtres Contemporains de l'Orgue offers church musicians and all lovers of good music a careful selection of pieces that have not so far been published elsewhere. These pieces represent all styles and schools of composition, and have been drawn from all countries. They are in general not too demanding, and can be performed on a standard harmonium just as well as on the most elaborate instrument.

The Anthology is thus a veritable encyclopædia of modern writing for the organ, gaining an exceptional interest from offering a wide range of styles and from its international character.

I am delighted to take this occasion of publicly acknowledging the gratitude I owe to the many and illustrious composers who, in response to my modest request for help, chose to write pieces specially for this Collection. It is this range of remarkable compositions that makes the Anthology worthy of a special place in the library of any organist.

It is with particular pleasure that I can offer my gratitude and respect to mm. Ch.-M. Widor, F. de la Tombelle and Alphonse Mailly, who have graciously allowed me to dedicate a volume to each of them. Patronage at this level seems to me already a guarantee of success, and also the most authoritative possible confirmation of the value of the pieces included in the Anthology.

While I was preparing this publication, m. Henry Eymieu was unstintingly generous with advice born of experience and with kindly encouragement; he also contributed to the biographical notes, giving them a personal and critical touch I much appreciate. I hope he may be pleased to accept my warmest thanks for his contribution!

Though most of the composers represented in the Anthology are already well-known, it seemed to me useful to provide a few lines of biographical and bibliographical information for each of them. If these lines are unavoidably brief and incomplete, the pieces which these Modern Masters of the Organ have contributed will speak for their composers.

Solemnity of liturgy and dignified church music! These matters are rightly, and all the more so since the publication of the motu proprio from His Holiness Pius X, of great concern to all who have received the noble task of praising the name of the Lord and of helping others do so. May this work I have undertaken for the sake of Religion and of Art add yet more to the splendour and beauty of our liturgical celebrations!

Such is the desire of the Author: to see this desire realised would be the best possible reward for my modest labours!

l'abbé Jos. Joubert

Preface to Volume I, translation by Niels Grundtvig Nielsen

Composers in École française, volume I
note: some links in this list are to content in 

 Andlauer, Louis
 Barié, Augustin
 Bazelaire, Paul
 Bentz, Jules
 Blin, René
 Bonnal, Ermend Joseph
 Boucher, Roger
 Boulanger, Nadia
 Boulnois, Joseph
 Canton, Léon
 Cellier, Alexandre Eugène
 Colinet, Arthur
 Collin, Charles
 Collin, Charles Augustin
 Combes, Paul
 Courtonne, Marcel
 Dallier, Henri
 Darros, Noël
 Debat-Ponson, Georges
 Decq, Adhémar
 Delune, Louis
 Delvincourt, Claude
 Dodement, Arthur
 Doney, Camille
 Dumas, Louis
 Dupré, Marcel
 Eymieu, Henry
 Fauchey, Paul
 Fleuret, Daniel
 Ganaye, Jean-Baptiste
 Garbet, Gabriel
 Gastoué, Amédée
 George, Max
 Gigout, Eugène
 Gouard, Henri
 Grigi, Constant Raoul
 Grosjean, Ernest
 Guilmant, Alexandre
 Guiraud, Georges
 Huré, Jean
 Indy, Vincent d'
 Jacob, Georges
 Jacquemin, Louis
 Jemain, Joseph
 Kunc, Aloys
 Lacroix, Eugène
 Landais, Eugène

Composers in École française, volume II 
 Lefebvre, Charles
 Le Guennant, Auguste
 Letocart, Henri
 Libert, Henri
 Marichelle, Alfred
 Marty, Adolphe
 Massenet, Jules
 Messerer, Henri
 Mulet, Henri
 Nibelle, Henri
 Paraire, Saturnin
 Perruchot, Louis-Lazare
 Pessard, Émile
 Philip, Achille
 Pierné, Paul
 Pineau, Charles
 Planchet, Dominique-Charles
 Pollet, Charles-Marie
 Potiron, Henri
 Prestat, Marie
 Quef, Charles
 Raffat de Bailhac, Amédée-Marie
 Ranse, Marc de
 Ratez, Émile
 Raugel, Félix Alphonse
 Renard, Georges-François
 Renaud, Albert
 Renoux, André
 Reuchsel, Amédée
 Reuchsel, Léon
 Reuchsel, Maurice
 Rouher, Marcel
 Rozan, Blanche
 Saint-Réquier, Léon de
 Schmitt, Alphonse
 Schmitt, Florent
 Selva, Blanche
 Sérieyx, Auguste
 Vadon, Jean
 Vallombrosa, Amédée de
 Vidal, Paul
 Vierne, Louis
 Vierne, René
 Vivet, Armand
 Walter, Désiré

References

Compositions for organ